Libidza  is a village in the administrative district of Gmina Kłobuck, within Kłobuck County, Silesian Voivodeship, in southern Poland.

The village has a population of 711.

References

Libidza